The York Tramways Company and its successor the City of York Tramways Company provided a horse-drawn tramway service in York between 1881 and 1909.

History

The York Tramways Company was incorporated by Act of Parliament in 1879. Construction started in July 1880 with a route to Fulford Village. The engineer was Joseph Kincaid.

Initially the company hoped to operate a steam tramway and Major General Charles Scrope Hutchinson from the Board of Trade approved the use of steam power. However, the steam experiment must have been unsuccessful as the company eventually gave up and maintained the service with horse cars.

Three routes were constructed from the city centre to Fulford Village, York railway station and Knavesmire.

A new company, the City of York Tramways Company was formed in 1886. It was a subsidiary of the Imperial Tramways Company based in Bristol. It acquired the assets of the York Tramways Company for £14,500 (equivalent to £ in ).

By 1891 the company operated 10 tramcars with a stable of 37 horses.

Closure

The system was taken over by York Corporation Tramways on 27 February 1909.

References

Tram transport in England
1881 establishments in England
History of York
Rail transport in York
4 ft gauge railways in England
Transport companies established in 1881
British companies established in 1881
1909 disestablishments in England
Transport companies disestablished in 1909
20th century in York
19th century in York
British companies disestablished in 1909